Broad Fen, Dilham is a  biological Site of Special Scientific Interest north-east of Norwich in Norfolk. It is part of the Broadland Ramsar site and Special Protection Area and The Broads Special Area of Conservation.

This site's diverse habitats include fen, carr woodland, open water and fen meadows. The open water includes ponds which were dug to attract wildfowl, a stretch of the Dilham Canal and dykes. Aquatic plants include bladderwort and white water lily.

References

Sites of Special Scientific Interest in Norfolk
Special Protection Areas in England
Special Areas of Conservation in England
Ramsar sites in England